Studio Yotta is an American animation studio founded by Jake Ganz and Brandon Clark in 2012. The company consists of a remote team of artists and animators that produces animation for the internet, video games and television.

Filmography

References

External links
 

American companies established in 2012
Entertainment companies established in 2012
Mass media companies established in 2012
American animation studios
Adult animation studios
Companies based in Washington (state)